Roberto Goretti (born 28 May 1976) is an Italian professional football technical director and former player, who is the technical director of Reggiana. He played as a midfielder.

Goretti spent most of his career at Serie B, and also played 85 Serie A matches.

Club career
Goretti started his career at hometown club Perugia, where he won promotion to Serie A in 1996. After Perugia were relegated in 1997, he was signed by Napoli, who in next season faced another relegation. In the next one-and-a-half Serie B seasons, Goretti only played eight league matches, before joining Bologna of Serie A in mid-season. He only played 11 league matches in two Serie A seasons, before joined Serie C1 side Reggiana in January 2003.

After having played two-and-a-half seasons, he left for Serie A side Ancona. In 2004, he signed for Serie B side Bari. In 2006, he was signed by Arezzo of Serie B, where he played 10 games as a starter in 22 league appearances. Arezzo were then relegated to Serie C1, where Goretti played one more season. He terminated his contract with the club in May 2008.

In 2008, he was signed by Como of Lega Pro Seconda Divisione, where he won the promotion play-offs. In 2009, Goretti signed a one-year contract with Foggia. In mid-season, he returned to Como. In the 2010–11 season, Goretti returned to Perugia again, winning promotion back to the professional league.

Managing career
In 2012, Goretti became technical director of Perugia's youth sector. In 2022, he was made technical director of Reggiana.

References

External links
 Profile at AIC.Football.it 
 Profile at La Gazzetta dello Sport (2006-07) 
 LaSerieD.com profile 

Italian footballers
Italy under-21 international footballers
Serie A players
Serie B players
A.C. Perugia Calcio players
S.S.C. Napoli players
Bologna F.C. 1909 players
A.C. Reggiana 1919 players
A.C. Ancona players
S.S.C. Bari players
S.S. Arezzo players
Como 1907 players
Calcio Foggia 1920 players
Association football midfielders
Sportspeople from Perugia
1976 births
Living people
Footballers from Umbria